Burrill is a small village in the Hambleton District of North Yorkshire, England.

References

Villages in North Yorkshire